The 2012–13 Northern Arizona Lumberjacks men's basketball team represented Northern Arizona University during the 2012–13 NCAA Division I men's basketball season. The Lumberjacks, led by first year head coach Jack Murphy, played their home games at the Walkup Skydome, with two home games at the Rolle Activity Center, and were members of the Big Sky Conference. They finished the season 11–21, 8–12 in Big Sky play to finish in a three-way tie for sixth place. They lost in the quarterfinals of the Big Sky tournament to Weber State.

Roster

Schedule

|-
!colspan=9| Exhibition

|-
!colspan=9| Regular season

|-
!colspan=9| 2013 Big Sky Conference men's basketball tournament

References

Northern Arizona Lumberjacks men's basketball seasons
Northern Arizona